Jon Awe (born April 30, 1980) is an American former professional ice hockey defenseman who played in the American Hockey League (AHL).

Playing career
The 6-foot-4, 240-pound native of Memphis, Tenn., played junior hockey with the South Suburban Steers in the Minnesota Junior Hockey League. Awe played four years at Northeastern University from 2001–05 tallying 32 points (6-26=32) and 90 PIM in 111 games for the Huskies. He led team defensemen in the 2003–04 season with 13 points.

After his senior year with the Huskies, Awe signed with the Gwinnett Gladiators of the ECHL for the 2005–06 season. Awe also made his AHL debut in stints with the Portland Pirates and the Providence Bruins. Awe had an impressive debut professional season and was named to the ECHL All-Rookie Team.

Awe was invited to the Gladiators NHL affiliate, the Atlanta Thrashers, training camp for the 2006–07 season. Failing to earn a contract with the Thrashers, Jon again played primarily for the Gwinnett Gladiators scoring 56 points (24-32=56) and 65 penalty minutes (PIM) in 60 games. At the ECHL All-Star Game he launched 102.2 mph shot in the Hardest Shot competition, obliterating the old mark by 2.9 mph.

Awe split the 2007–08 season with Gwinnett Gladiators and the Houston Aeros. In 59 games with Aeros(AHL), Awe marked a career high 5 goals, 17 assists for 22 points.

Awe signed a one-year deal with Anyang Halla on July 16, 2008, recommended by club's scout & interpreter Samuel H. Kim. He became the first U.S born player in club's history. After a solid season, in which he tied for 1st overall in defenseman goal scoring with 12 Goals (Tied with Ricard Persson), Awe was signed to 2 year-extension on February, 2009.   After Halla's September 27, 2009 game against High1 in Goyang it was announced that Awe had a sport's hernia and that he would miss 8 to 12 weeks of the 2009–10 season. Awe captured his first ever championship title, beating Nippon Paper Cranes series of 3–2 in 2009-2010 Asia League final.

On July 13, 2011, Awe signed with HC Valpellice of Italian Serie A on a one-year deal. He returned the following season in 2012–13 to play in 8 games with the Gwinnett Gladiators to end his professional career.

Career statistics

Awards and achievements
2005–06  -ECHL All-Rookie All-Star Team
2006–07  -ECHL Defenseman of the Year
2006–07  -ECHL First All-Star Team
2009–10  -Asia League (ALH) Champion
2010–11  -Asia League (ALH) Champion

References

External links 

1980 births
American men's ice hockey defensemen
HL Anyang players
Sportspeople from Memphis, Tennessee
Ice hockey people from Tennessee
Chicago Wolves players
Gwinnett Gladiators players
Houston Aeros (1994–2013) players
Living people
Northeastern Huskies men's ice hockey players
Portland Pirates players
Providence Bruins players
Texas Tornado players
HC Valpellice players
Wilkes-Barre/Scranton Penguins players